Streptomyces fragilis is a bacterium species from the genus of Streptomyces which has been isolated from soil in Argentina. Streptomyces fragilis produces the antibiotic azaserine.

See also 
 List of Streptomyces species

References

Further reading

External links
Type strain of Streptomyces fragilis at BacDive -  the Bacterial Diversity Metadatabase

fragilis
Bacteria described in 1956